Radical 110 or radical spear meaning "spear" is one of the 23 Kangxi radicals (214 radicals in total) composed of 5 strokes.

In the Kangxi Dictionary, there are 65 characters (out of 49,030) to be found under this radical.

 is also the 121st indexing component in the Table of Indexing Chinese Character Components predominantly adopted by Simplified Chinese dictionaries published in mainland China.

Evolution

Derived characters

Literature

External links

 Unihan Database - U+77DB

110
121